Puzzle Panic, also known as Ken Uston's Puzzle Panic, is a video game created by blackjack strategist Ken Uston, Bob Polin (designer of Blue Max), and Ron Karr. It was published by Epyx in 1984 for the Atari 8-bit family and Commodore 64.

Gameplay 

The player guides Benny, a light bulb, through a series of 11 puzzles, each with varying difficulty settings (a total of over 40 levels). At the completion of each level, there are a few available exits, each bearing an obscure symbol, which take Benny forward or back in the game (or possibly to repeat the level). The final level, the "Metasequence," is a cryptic puzzle with a non-explicit objective. Its original purpose was part of a contest: those who solved it correctly by the August 13, 1984 deadline could enter in a drawing to win a weekend at an Atlantic City casino with co-creator Ken Uston.

Development
A pre-release version of the game was called PuzzleMania.

Reception
Steve Panak wrote in ANALOG Computing, "Puzzle Panic is so radically different, so unlike anything else you've ever set your cathode-raybloodshot eyes on, that there's no readily memorable program to compare it with," and called the game "addictive." He disliked the brief window for winning the contest; it had already expired by the time he played.

Fred Pinho wrote in Antic:

References

External links
 Puzzle Panic at Atari Mania

1984 video games
Atari 8-bit family games
Commodore 64 games
Epyx games
MSX games
Puzzle video games
Video games developed in the United States